Peter Johansson is a Swedish former professional Grand Prix motocross racer. He competed in the Motocross World Championships from 1990 to 2000.

Johansson finished third in the F.I.M. 500cc motocross world championship three times, in 1996, 1998 and 2000. In 1999, he finished in second place behind Andrea Bartolini. Johansson retired after the 2000 season.

References 

Swedish motocross riders
Living people
Year of birth missing (living people)
Place of birth missing (living people)